John R. "Trip" Adler III is an American entrepreneur. He is the CEO and co-founder of Scribd, a digital library and document-sharing platform, which has 80 million users.

Background and early career
Adler grew up in Palo Alto, California and attended Gunn High School. He graduated from Harvard University with a biophysics degree. His father, John R. Adler, is a neurosurgeon at Stanford University and also an entrepreneur.

After graduating from Harvard, Adler contemplated starting various online ventures, including a ride-sharing service, a Craigslist-type site for colleges, a call center called 1-800-ASKTRIP, and a social media site called "Rate your happiness."

Scribd
Adler received inspiration for Scribd from a conversation with his father, who had difficulty publishing an academic paper in a medical journal. Adler then built Scribd with Jared Friedman, a fellow Harvard student, and they attended Y Combinator in the summer of 2006. Scribd was launched from a San Francisco apartment in March 2007. In 2008, it ranked as one of the top 20 social media sites according to Comscore. In June 2009, Scribd launched Scribd Store, and shortly thereafter closed a deal with Simon & Schuster to sell ebooks on Scribd. In 2012, the company became profitable.

In October 2013, Scribd launched a subscription ebook service, and signed a deal with HarperCollins to make their backlist books available on Scribd. Scribd was once known for unlimited audiobooks and downloadable books. In 2016 the subscription limited the number of titles available to subscribers. This was reversed in 2018, wherein readers were offered access to an "unlimited number of books and audiobooks for $8.99 per month".

Scribd has over 300,000 titles from 1,000 publishers in its book subscription service. In August 2017, the company announced a partnership with Zinio, which calls itself the world's largest digital magazine producer and distributor, to add 30 new magazine titles to the Scribd portfolio.

Personal life
As a member of the Harvard Surfing team, Adler participated in the first Ivy League Surf Championships in May 2003. He also plays the saxophone. In 2007, Adler earned the company's first $17 in revenue by playing the saxophone outside Scribd's office at Christmas time.

Awards and recognition
 Named to TIME’s list of tech pioneers of 2010
 Named to Bloomberg Businessweek’s list of best young entrepreneurs
 Forbes 30 Under 30

References

External links
 Adler's profile page on Scribd
 Scribd CEO Trip Adler on the Economics of Ebook Subscription Models, the ‘Big Five,’ and the Competition on Digital Book World
 Scribd CEO Explains His 'Eureka' Moment on CNBC
 Scribd CEO Trip Adler Speaks! on All Things Digital

Living people
American computer businesspeople
American technology chief executives
American technology company founders
Businesspeople in information technology
Harvard School of Engineering and Applied Sciences alumni
People from Palo Alto, California
Year of birth missing (living people)
Gunn High School alumni